Incunabula are printed material from before the year 1501 in Europe.

Incunabula may also refer to:
Incunabula, Op. 39, a set of three short compositions for piano by Swan Hennessy (1912)
Incunabula (video game), a computer game by Avalon Hill (1984)
Incunabula (publisher), a small press based in Seattle, Washington, founded in 1992
Incunabula (album), an album by British electronic music duo Autechre (1993)

See also
Incunabula Short Title Catalogue, an electronic bibliographic database maintained by the British Library